Peter C. Borsari (1939 in Zürich – May 29, 2006 in Los Angeles) was an American-Swiss photographer.

Borsari photographed people, places and events from 1965 to 1995, with subjects including Presley and Nixon.

Peter estimated his archive contained approximately two million images; including transparencies, negatives, prints and contact
sheets. Roughly 80% of these images feature celebrities in the entertainment industry. The remainder consists primarily of prominent
politicians (e.g. Nixon), athletes (e.g. Ali), events (e.g. Malibu fire), sports (e.g. Formula One) and travel destinations (e.g. Switzerland).

References 

Swiss photographers
20th-century American photographers
1939 births
2006 deaths